The surname Orrell may refer to the following people:

 David Orrell (born 1962), Canadian mathematician 
 Eddie Orrell (born 1965), Canadian politician in Nova Scotia
 Joe Orrell (1917–1993), baseball player
 John Orrell (1934–2003), author, theatre historian, and English professor 
 John Orrell Lever (1824–1897), English shipping owner and politician 
 Marc Orrell (born 1982), American guitarist
 Richard Orrell (1875–1919), English footballer
 Timothy Orrell (born 1967), English cricketer

See also
 Orrell (disambiguation)